Ascorbic acid is an organic compound with formula , originally called hexuronic acid. It is a white solid, but impure samples can appear yellowish.  It dissolves well in water to give mildly acidic solutions.  It is a mild reducing agent.

Ascorbic acid exists as two enantiomers (mirror-image isomers), commonly denoted "" (for "levo") and "" (for "dextro"). The  isomer is the one most often encountered: it occurs naturally in many foods, and is one form ("vitamer") of vitamin C, an essential nutrient for humans and many animals. Deficiency of vitamin C causes scurvy, formerly a major disease of sailors in long sea voyages. It is used as a food additive and a dietary supplement for its antioxidant properties. The "" form can be made via chemical synthesis but has no significant biological role.

History

The antiscorbutic properties of certain foods were demonstrated in the 18th century by James Lind. In 1907, Axel Holst and Theodor Frølich discovered that the antiscorbutic factor was a water-soluble chemical substance, distinct from the one that prevented beriberi. Between 1928 and 1932, Albert Szent-Györgyi isolated a candidate for this substance, which he called it "hexuronic acid", first from plants and later from animal adrenal glands. In 1932 Charles Glen King confirmed that it was indeed the antiscorbutic factor.

In 1933, sugar chemist Walter Norman Haworth, working with samples of "hexuronic acid" that Szent-Györgyi had isolated from paprika and sent him in the previous year, deduced the correct structure and optical-isomeric nature of the compound, and in 1934 reported its first synthesis. In reference to the compound's antiscorbutic properties, Haworth and Szent-Györgyi proposed to rename it "a-scorbic acid" for the compound, and later specifically -ascorbic acid.  Because of their work, in 1937 the Nobel Prizes for chemistry and medicine were awarded to Haworth and Szent-Györgyi, respectively.

Chemical properties

Acidity
Ascorbic acid is a furan-based lactone of 2-ketogluconic acid. It contains an adjacent enediol adjacent to the carbonyl. This −C(OH)=C(OH)−C(=O)− structural pattern is characteristic of reductones, and increases the acidity of one of the enol hydroxyl groups. The deprotonated conjugate base is the ascorbate anion, which is stabilized by electron delocalization that results from resonance between two forms:

 

For this reason, ascorbic acid is much more acidic than would be expected if the compound contained only isolated hydroxyl groups.

Salts
The ascorbate anion forms salts, such as sodium ascorbate, calcium ascorbate, and potassium ascorbate.

Esters
Ascorbic acid can also react with organic acids as an alcohol forming esters such as ascorbyl palmitate and ascorbyl stearate.

Nucleophilic attack
Nucleophilic attack of ascorbic acid on a proton results in a 1,3-diketone:

Oxidation

The ascorbate ion is the predominant species at typical biological pH values. It is a mild reducing agent and antioxidant. It is oxidized with loss of one electron to form a radical cation and then with loss of a second electron to form dehydroascorbic acid. It typically reacts with oxidants of the reactive oxygen species, such as the hydroxyl radical.

Ascorbic acid is special because it can transfer a single electron, owing to the resonance-stabilized nature of its own radical ion, called semidehydroascorbate. The net reaction is:

RO• +  → RO− + C6H7O → ROH + C6H6O6

On exposure to oxygen, ascorbic acid will undergo further oxidative decomposition to various products including diketogulonic acid, xylonic acid, threonic acid and oxalic acid.

Reactive oxygen species are damaging to animals and plants at the molecular level due to their possible interaction with nucleic acids, proteins, and lipids. Sometimes these radicals initiate chain reactions. Ascorbate can terminate these chain radical reactions by electron transfer.  The oxidized forms of ascorbate are relatively unreactive and do not cause cellular damage.

However, being a good electron donor, excess ascorbate in the presence of free metal ions can not only promote but also initiate free radical reactions, thus making it a potentially dangerous pro-oxidative compound in certain metabolic contexts.

Ascorbic acid and its sodium, potassium, and calcium salts are commonly used as antioxidant food additives. These compounds are water-soluble and, thus, cannot protect fats from oxidation: For this purpose, the fat-soluble esters of ascorbic acid with long-chain fatty acids (ascorbyl palmitate or ascorbyl stearate) can be used as food antioxidants.

Other reactions
It creates volatile compounds when mixed with glucose and amino acids in 90 °C.

It is a cofactor in tyrosine oxidation.

Uses

Food additive
The main use of -ascorbic acid and its salts is as food additives, mostly to combat oxidation.  It is approved for this purpose in the EU with E number E300, USA, Australia, and New Zealand.

Dietary supplement
Another major use of -ascorbic acid is as dietary supplement.

Niche, non-food uses

 Ascorbic acid is easily oxidized and so is used as a reductant in photographic developer solutions (among others) and as a preservative.
 In fluorescence microscopy and related fluorescence-based techniques, ascorbic acid can be used as an antioxidant to increase fluorescent signal and chemically retard dye photobleaching.
 It is also commonly used to remove dissolved metal stains, such as iron, from fiberglass swimming pool surfaces.
 In plastic manufacturing, ascorbic acid can be used to assemble molecular chains more quickly and with less waste than traditional synthesis methods.
 Heroin users are known to use ascorbic acid as a means to convert heroin base to a water-soluble salt so that it can be injected.
 As justified by its reaction with iodine, it is used to negate the effects of iodine tablets in water purification. It reacts with the sterilized water, removing the taste, color, and smell of the iodine. This is why it is often sold as a second set of tablets in most sporting goods stores as Potable Aqua-Neutralizing Tablets, along with the potassium iodide tablets.
Intravenous high-dose ascorbate is being used as a chemotherapeutic and biological response modifying agent. Currently it is still under clinical trials.
 It is sometimes used as a urinary acidifier to enhance the antiseptic effect of methenamine.

Synthesis
Natural biosynthesis of vitamin C occurs in many plants, and animals, by a variety of processes.

Industrial preparation

Eighty percent of the world's supply of ascorbic acid is produced in China. Ascorbic acid is prepared in industry from glucose in a method based on the historical Reichstein process. In the first of a five-step process, glucose is catalytically hydrogenated to sorbitol, which is then oxidized by the microorganism Acetobacter suboxydans to sorbose. Only one of the six hydroxy groups is oxidized by this enzymatic reaction. From this point, two routes are available. Treatment of the product with acetone in the presence of an acid catalyst converts four of the remaining hydroxyl groups to acetals. The unprotected hydroxyl group is oxidized to the carboxylic acid by reaction with the catalytic oxidant TEMPO (regenerated by sodium hypochlorite bleaching solution). Historically, industrial preparation via the Reichstein process used potassium permanganate as the bleaching solution. Acid-catalyzed hydrolysis of this product performs the dual function of removing the two acetal groups and ring-closing lactonization. This step yields ascorbic acid. Each of the five steps has a yield larger than 90%.

A more biotechnological process, first developed in China in the 1960s, but further developed in the 1990s,  bypasses the use of acetone-protecting groups. A second genetically modified microbe species, such as mutant Erwinia, among others, oxidises sorbose into 2-ketogluconic acid (2-KGA), which can then undergo ring-closing lactonization via dehydration. This method is used in the predominant process used by the ascorbic acid industry in China, which supplies 80% of world's ascorbic acid. American and Chinese researchers are competing to engineer a mutant that can carry out a one-pot fermentation directly from glucose to 2-KGA, bypassing both the need for a second fermentation and the need to reduce glucose to sorbitol.

There exists a -ascorbic acid, which does not occur in nature but can be synthesized artificially. To be specific, -ascorbate is known to participate in many specific enzyme reactions that require the correct enantiomer (-ascorbate and not -ascorbate). -Ascorbic acid has a specific rotation of [α] = +23°.

Determination
The traditional way to analyze the ascorbic acid content is the process of titration with an oxidizing agent, and several procedures have been developed.

The popular iodometry approach uses iodine in the presence of a starch indicator. Iodine is reduced by ascorbic acid, and, when all the ascorbic acid has reacted, the iodine is then in excess, forming a blue-black complex with the starch indicator.  This indicates the end-point of the titration.

As an alternative, ascorbic acid can be treated with iodine in excess, followed by back titration with sodium thiosulfate using starch as an indicator.

This iodometric method has been revised to exploit reaction of ascorbic acid with iodate and iodide in acid solution. Electrolyzing the solution of potassium iodide produces iodine, which reacts with ascorbic acid. The end of process is determined by potentiometric titration in a manner similar to Karl Fischer titration. The amount of ascorbic acid can be calculated by Faraday's law.

Another alternative uses N-bromosuccinimide (NBS) as the oxidizing agent, in the presence of potassium iodide and starch. The NBS first oxidizes the ascorbic acid; when the latter is exhausted, the NBS liberates the iodine from the potassium iodide, which then forms the blue-black complex with starch.

See also 
 Colour retention agent
 Erythorbic acid: a diastereomer of ascorbic acid.
 Mineral ascorbates: salts of ascorbic acid
 Acids in wine

References

Further reading

External links 

IPCS Poisons Information Monograph (PIM) 046
Interactive 3D-structure of vitamin C with details on the x-ray structure

Organic acids
Antioxidants
Dietary antioxidants
Coenzymes
Corrosion inhibitors
Furanones
Vitamers
Vitamin C
Biomolecules
3-Hydroxypropenals